Międzyzdroje Pier is a pier 395 metres long, stretching out into the Baltic Sea from the beach in Międzyzdroje, West Pomeranian Voivodeship, Poland. The pier also functions as a harbour.

Construction
The pier is made of reinforced concrete, on the Island of Wolin, Poland. The structure extends into the Bay of Pomerania, in the north-west direction from the beach in Międzyzdroje. The pier is located close by to the amphitheatre in the central part of Międzyzdroje Beach. The entrance onto the pier is marked by two white towers.

References

Piers in Poland
Kamień County
1971 establishments in Poland
Buildings and structures completed in 1971
Buildings and structures in West Pomeranian Voivodeship